Vitaly Dmitrievich Buterin, better known as Vitalik Buterin (Вита́лий Дми́триевич "Вита́лик" Буте́рин, born 1994), is a Russian-Canadian computer programmer, and founder of Ethereum. Buterin became involved with cryptocurrency early in its inception, co-founding Bitcoin Magazine in 2011. In 2014, Buterin deployed the Ethereum blockchain with Dimitry Buterin, Gavin Wood, Charles Hoskinson, Anthony Di Iorio, and Joseph Lubin.

Early life and education
Buterin was born in Kolomna, Russia, in 1994. His father was a computer scientist. He lived in the area until the age of six, when his parents emigrated to Canada in search of better employment opportunities. While in grade three of elementary school in Canada, Buterin was placed into a class for gifted children and was drawn to mathematics, programming, and economics. Buterin then attended The Abelard School, a private high school in Toronto. Buterin learned about Bitcoin from his father, Dimitry Buterin, at the age of 17.

After high school, Buterin attended the University of Waterloo. There, he took advanced courses and was a research assistant for cryptographer Ian Goldberg, who co-created Off-the-Record Messaging and was the former board of directors chairman of the Tor Project. In 2012, Buterin won a bronze medal in the International Olympiad in Informatics in Italy.

In 2013, he visited developers in other countries who shared his enthusiasm for code. He returned to Toronto later that year and published a white paper proposing Ethereum. He dropped out of university in 2014 when he was awarded with a grant of $100,000 from the Thiel Fellowship, a scholarship created by venture capitalist Peter Thiel and went to work on Ethereum full-time.

On 30 November 2018, Buterin received an honorary doctorate from the Faculty of Business and Economics of the University of Basel on the occasion of the Dies Academicus.

Career

Bitcoin Magazine 

In 2011, Buterin began writing for a publication called Bitcoin Weekly after meeting a person on a bitcoin forum with the aim of earning bitcoin. The owner offered five bitcoin (about $3.50 at the time) to anyone who would write an article for him. Buterin wrote for the site until it shut down soon thereafter due to insufficient revenue. In September 2011, Mihai Alisie reached out to Buterin about starting a new print publication called Bitcoin Magazine, a position which Buterin would accept as the first co-founder, and contribute to as a leading writer.

Bitcoin Magazine in 2012 later began publishing a print edition and has been referred to as the first serious publication dedicated to cryptocurrencies. While working for Bitcoin Magazine, Buterin reached out to Jed McCaleb for a job at Ripple who accepted. However, their proposed employment fell apart after Ripple was unable to support a U.S. visa for Buterin.

In addition, he held a position on the editorial board of Ledger in 2016, a peer-reviewed scholarly journal that publishes full-length original research articles on the subjects of cryptocurrency and blockchain technology.

Ethereum 

Buterin is a co-founder and inventor of Ethereum, described as a "decentralised mining network and software development platform rolled into one" that facilitates the creation of new cryptocurrencies and programs that share a single blockchain (a cryptographic transaction ledger).

Buterin first described Ethereum in a white paper in November 2013. Buterin had argued that bitcoin needed a scripting language for application development. But when he failed to gain agreement, he proposed development of a new platform with a more general scripting language.
 
The Ethereum white paper was circulated and interest grew in the new protocol in late 2013 and early 2014. Buterin announced Ethereum more publicly at the North American Bitcoin Conference in Miami on 26 January. Buterin delivered a 25-minute speech, describing the general-purpose global computer operating on a decentralized permissionless network, ending with potential uses for Ethereum that ranged from crop insurance to decentralized exchanges to DAOs.

About the Ethereum Project, Buterin said in 2020: "I am truly grateful to have the opportunity to work in such an interesting and interdisciplinary area of industry, where I have the chance to interact with cryptographers, mathematicians and economists prominent in their fields, to help build software and tools that already affect tens of thousands of people around the world, and to work on advanced problems in computer science, economics and philosophy every week." However, in a 2018 New Yorker article, his father suggests that Buterin is trying to avoid the focus on him as the philosopher king of the blockchain world, stating "He is trying to focus his time on research. He's not too excited that the community assigns so much importance to him. He wants the community to be more resilient."

Buterin has stated that he was driven to create decentralized money because his World of Warcraft character was nerfed, specifically by patch 3.1.0. He went on to say in his about.me bio, "I happily played World of Warcraft during 2007–2010, but one day Blizzard removed the damage component from my beloved warlock’s Siphon Life spell. I cried myself to sleep, and on that day I realized what horrors centralized services can bring. I soon decided to quit."

Open-source software 
Buterin has contributed as a developer to other open-source software projects. He also contributed to DarkWallet by Cody Wilson, Bitcoin Python libraries, and the cryptocurrency marketplace site Egora.

Ethereum Russia 
As Buterin was recognizing the economic and political relevance of the Ethereum enterprise for his native Russia, he met with President Vladimir Putin on 2 June 2017, at the St. Petersburg International Economic Forum (SPIEF). Putin stated that he "supported the idea of establishing ties with possible Russian partners".

Work with Glen Weyl
Buterin came into contact with economist Glen Weyl after tweeting about Weyl's proposal for a new wealth tax. The two then wrote a manifesto Liberation Through Radical Decentralization, where they highlighted the common ground between Buterin's work on cryptocurrencies and Weyl's work on market-based solutions to social problems. Collaborating with Zoe Hitzig, a PhD student at Harvard, they published a paper in 2019 entitled A Flexible Design for Funding Public Goods. The paper sets out a method for optimal provision of public goods, using a version of quadratic voting.

Awards and recognition 
 Thiel Fellowship, 2014
 World Technology Award in the IT Software category, 2014
 Fortune 40 under 40 list, 2016
 Forbes 30 under 30 list, 2018
 Fortune the ledger 40 under 40 list, 2018
 University of Basel Honorary doctorate, 2018
 Time 100, 2021

Philanthropy

 Donation of $763,970 of Ether to the Machine Intelligence Research Institute in 2017.

 Donation of $2.4 million of Ether to the SENS Research Foundation in 2018, for the research on rejuvenation biotechnologies and human life extension.

 Donation of $50,000 to the SENS Research Foundation in 2020. Together with Sam Bankman-Fried and Haseeb Qureshi, a total of $150,000 was donated the SENS Research Foundation to combat aging and aging-related diseases at the choice of users of Twitter through open voting.

 Buterin donated $1.14 billion USD worth of SHIBA coins, which had previously been gifted to him, to India's Crypto Covid relief fund in 2021. This donation was 5% of the coin in circulation and caused a 50% crash in the price at the time.

 Donation of $336 million worth of Dogelon Mars ($ELON), which had previously been gifted to him, to the Methuselah Foundation, which focuses on extending human lifespan, on 12 May 2021. Buterin's donation of the memecoin caused a 70% drop in its value.

Philanthropic efforts during the 2022 Russian invasion of Ukraine 
Following the 2022 Russian invasion of Ukraine, Buterin has spoken out against Russia's incursion and has actively supported Ukraine as well as donated crypto to projects supporting the country.

On the first day of the invasion Buterin tweeted that "Ethereum is neutral, but I am not", and that Russia's attack is a crime against both the Ukrainian and the Russian people. This was followed by a "go fuck yourself" ("") a few days later in response to a tweet by RTs editor-in-chief Margarita Simonyan proclaiming that those who are ashamed to be Russians due to the country's actions toward Ukraine are in fact not Russians at all ("") a few days later. The co-founder of Ethereum has endorsed several different projects helping Ukraine through "cryptophilanthropy", including Ukraine DAO, in which his father Dmitry is involved in as (among others) a signer on its multi-signature crypto safe.

Books 
 Vitalik Buterin. Proof of Stake: The Making of Ethereum and the Philosophy of Blockchains. — Seven Stories Press, 2022. — С. 384. — ISBN 978-1644212486.

See also 
List of University of Waterloo people
List of people in blockchain technology
List of transhumanists
List of philanthropists

References

Citations

Works cited

External links
 

1994 births
Canadian computer programmers
Canadian magazine writers
Canadian transhumanists
Life extensionists
Living people
People associated with cryptocurrency
People associated with Ethereum
People from Kolomna
Russian activists against the 2022 Russian invasion of Ukraine
Russian emigrants to Canada
Thiel fellows
University of Waterloo alumni
Naturalized citizens of Montenegro
Naturalized citizens of Canada
Russian businesspeople in Canada